The 38th New York State Legislature, consisting of the New York State Senate and the New York State Assembly, met from September 26, 1814, to April 18, 1815, during the eighth year of Daniel D. Tompkins's governorship, in Albany.

Background
Under the provisions of the New York Constitution of 1777, amended by the Constitutional Convention of 1801, 32 Senators were elected on general tickets in the four senatorial districts for four-year terms. They were divided into four classes, and every year eight Senate seats came up for election. Assemblymen were elected countywide on general tickets to a one-year term, the whole Assembly being renewed annually.

In 1797, Albany was declared the State capital, and all subsequent Legislatures have been meeting there ever since. In 1799, the Legislature enacted that future Legislatures meet on the last Tuesday of January of each year unless called earlier by the governor.

State Senator John Tayler had been elected Lieutenant Governor of New York in 1813, leaving a vacancy in the Eastern District.

At this time the politicians were divided into two opposing political parties: the Federalists and the Democratic-Republicans.

Elections
The State election was held from April 26 to 28, 1814. Senator Philetus Swift (Western D.) was re-elected. Darius Crosby (Southern D.), Moses I. Cantine (Middle D.), George Tibbits (Eastern D.), Bennett Bicknell, Chauncey Loomis, John I. Prendergast (all three Western D.); and Assemblyman William Ross (Middle D.) were also elected to full terms in the Senate. Guert Van Schoonhoven (Eastern D.) was elected to fill the vacancy. Tibbits was a Federalist, the other eight were Democratic-Republicans.

Sessions
The Legislature met at the Old State Capitol in Albany on September 26, 1814, to enact legislation concerning the War against Great Britain; and adjourned on October 24.

Samuel Young (Dem.-Rep.) was elected Speaker with 61 votes against 35 for James Emott (Fed.). Aaron Clark (Dem.-Rep.) was elected Clerk of the Assembly with 60 votes against 37 for James Van Ingen (Fed.). At the end of this session, Jesse Buel was appointed by the Legislature to succeed Solomon Southwick as State Printer.

The Legislature met for the regular session on January 31, 1815; and adjourned on April 18.

On January 31, the Dem.-Rep. Assembly majority elected a new Council of Appointment which removed almost all Federalist office-holders.

On February 7, the Legislature elected State Senator Nathan Sanford (Dem.-Rep.) to succeed Obadiah German (Dem.-Rep.) as U.S. Senator from New York.

On April 8, 1815, the Legislature re-apportioned the Assembly districts, increasing the total number of assemblymen from 112 to 126.

On April 17, 1815, the Legislature re-apportioned the Senate districts: Dutchess, Putnam and Rockland Co. (and 1 seat) were transferred from the Middle to the Southern District; Albany Co. from the Eastern, and Chenango, Otsego and Schoharie Co. from the Western (and 3 seats) were transferred to the Middle District; Herkimer, Jefferson, Lewis and St. Lawrence Co. (and 3 seats) were transferred from the Western to the Eastern District. It was however too late to use this new apportionment at the State election held later this month.

State Senate

Districts
The Southern District (5 seats) consisted of Kings, New York, Queens, Richmond, Suffolk and Westchester counties.
The Middle District (7 seats) consisted of Dutchess, Orange, Ulster, Columbia, Delaware, Rockland, Greene, Sullivan and Putnam counties.
The Eastern District (8 seats) consisted of Washington, Clinton, Rensselaer, Albany, Saratoga, Essex, Montgomery, Franklin, Schenectady and Warren counties.
The Western District (12 seats) consisted of Herkimer, Ontario, Otsego, Tioga, Onondaga, Schoharie, Steuben, Chenango, Oneida, Cayuga, Genesee, Seneca, Jefferson, Lewis, St. Lawrence, Allegany, Broome, Madison, Niagara, Cortland, Cattaraugus and Chautauqua counties.

Note: There are now 62 counties in the State of New York. The counties which are not mentioned in this list had not yet been established, or sufficiently organized, the area being included in one or more of the abovementioned counties.

Members
The asterisk (*) denotes members of the previous Legislature who continued in office as members of this Legislature. William Ross changed from the Assembly to the Senate.

Employees
Clerk: John F. Bacon

State Assembly

Districts

Albany County (4 seats)
Allegany and Steuben counties (1 seat)
Broome County (1 seat)
Cattaraugus, Chautauqua and Niagara counties (1 seat)
Cayuga County (3 seats)
Chenango County (3 seats)
Clinton and Franklin counties (1 seat)
Cortland County (1 seat)
Columbia County (4 seats)
Delaware County (2 seats)
Dutchess County (5 seats)
Essex County (1 seat)
Genesee County (1 seat)
Greene County (2 seats)
Herkimer County (3 seats)
Jefferson County (2 seats)
Kings County (1 seat)
Lewis County (1 seat)
Madison County (3 seats)
Montgomery County (5 seats)
The City and County of New York (11 seats)
Oneida County (5 seats)
Onondaga County (2 seats)
Ontario County (5 seats)
Orange County (4 seats)
Otsego County (4 seats)
Putnam County (1 seat)
Queens County (3 seats)
Rensselaer County (4 seats)
Richmond County (1 seat)
Rockland County (1 seat)
St. Lawrence County (1 seat)
Saratoga County (4 seats)
Schenectady County (2 seats)
Schoharie County (2 seats)
Seneca County (1 seat)
Suffolk County (3 seats)
Sullivan and Ulster counties (4 seats)
Tioga County (1 seat)
Warren and Washington counties (5 seats)
Westchester County (3 seats)

Note: There are now 62 counties in the State of New York. The counties which are not mentioned in this list had not yet been established, or sufficiently organized, the area being included in one or more of the abovementioned counties.

Assemblymen
The asterisk (*) denotes members of the previous Legislature who continued as members of this Legislature.

Employees
Clerk: Aaron Clark
Sergeant-at-Arms: Thomas Donnelly
Doorkeeper: Benjamin Whipple

Notes

Sources
The New York Civil List compiled by Franklin Benjamin Hough (Weed, Parsons and Co., 1858) [see pg. 108f for Senate districts; pg. 122 for senators; pg. 148f for Assembly districts; pg. 189f for assemblymen]
The History of Political Parties in the State of New-York, from the Ratification of the Federal Constitution to 1840 by Jabez D. Hammond (4th ed., Vol. 1, H. & E. Phinney, Cooperstown, 1846; pages 375-400)
Partial election result Assembly, Clinton and Franklin Co. at project "A New Nation Votes", compiled by Phil Lampi, hosted by Tufts University Digital Library [gives only votes from Clinton Co.]
Election result Assembly, Cortland Co. at project "A New Nation Votes"
Election result Assembly, Dutchess Co. at project "A New Nation Votes"
Election result Assembly, Greene Co. at project "A New Nation Votes"
Election result Assembly, Herkimer Co. at project "A New Nation Votes"
Election result Assembly, Kings Co. at project "A New Nation Votes"
Election result Assembly, Lewis Co. at project "A New Nation Votes"
Election result Assembly, Onondaga Co. at project "A New Nation Votes"
Election result Assembly, Otsego Co. at project "A New Nation Votes"
Election result Assembly, Rensselaer Co. at project "A New Nation Votes"
Election result Assembly, Rockland Co. at project "A New Nation Votes"
Election result Assembly, Schenectady Co. at project "A New Nation Votes"
Election result Assembly, Schoharie Co. at project "A New Nation Votes"
Election result Assembly, Suffolk Co. at project "A New Nation Votes"
Partial election result Senate, Southern D. at project "A New Nation Votes" [gives only votes of Kings and Suffolk Co.]
Partial election result Senate, Middle D. at project "A New Nation Votes" [gives only votes of Dutchess, Greene and Rockland Co.)
Partial election result Senate, Eastern D. at project "A New Nation Votes" [gives only votes of Albany, Clinton, Rensselaer and Schenectady Co.]
Partial election result Senate, Western D. at project "A New Nation Votes" [gives only votes of Cortland, Herkimer, Jefferson, Onondaga, Otsego and Schoharie Co.]
Election result, Speaker at project "A New Nation Votes"
Election result, Assembly Clerk at project "A New Nation Votes"
Election result, Council of Appointment at project "A New Nation Votes"

038
1814 in New York (state)
1815 in New York (state)
1814 U.S. legislative sessions